Alauddin (Arabic: علاء الدين) is a Muslim male given name and, in modern usage, also a surname. This name derives from the Arabic “ʻAlāʼ ad-Dīn”, meaning “servant of Allah, nobility of faith, nobility of religion, nobility of the faith”. It is one of a large class of names ending with ad-Din.

Given name 

 Alauddin Khalji, emperor of the Khalji dynasty.
 Alauddin Ahammad, Bangladeshi politician and academic
 Alauddin Al-Azad (1932–2009), Bangladeshi author, novelist, and poet.
 Alauddin Ali, Bangladeshi music composer
 Alauddin Marri (b. 1979), Pakistani businessman and social worker.
 Alauddin Sabir Kaliyari  (b. 1196 AD), South Asian Sufi saint in the 13th century
 Alauddin Siddiqui (1938-2017) Islamic Sufi Scholar from Azad Kashmir, Pakistan.
 Alauddin (cricketer) (b: 1976), Pakistani former cricketer.
 Alauddin Jani, governor of Bengal at 12th century of Mamluk dynasty
 Alauddin Ali Shah, independent ruler of Lakhnauti, the old capital of Bengal
 Alauddin al-Kahar, 3rd sultan of Aceh.
 Alauddin Mansur Syah (died 1585), 8th Sultan of Aceh in northern Sumatra
 Alauddin Mahmud Syah I (died 1781), 25th sultan of Aceh in northern Sumatra.
 Alauddin Muhammad Syah (b. 1760), 28th sultan of Aceh in northern Sumatra.
 Alauddin Muhammad Da'ud Syah I (b: 1802), 31st sultan of Aceh in northern Sumatra.
 Alauddin Ibrahim Mansur Syah (died 1870) was the 33rd sultan of Aceh in northern Sumatra.
 Alauddin Mahmud Syah II (died 1874), 34th sultan of Aceh in northern Sumatra.
 Alauddin Muhammad Da'ud Syah II (b: 1864), 35th and last sultan of Aceh in northern Sumatra.
 Alauddin Masud, 7th sultan of the Mamluk dynasty in the 12th century. (Slave dynasty)

Surname 

 Md. Alauddin (1925–2000), a Bangladeshi politician
 Kazi Alauddin, a Bangladesh Jatiya Party politician.
 Gogi Alauddin (b: 1950), a former squash player from Pakistan.
 M. Alauddin, a Bangladeshi Academic & researcher, 10th VC of Islamic University, Bangladesh.

Disambiguation 

 Alauddin Firuz Shah (disambiguation)

References 

Arabic masculine given names
Iranian masculine given names
Turkish masculine given names